KR Sridhar  (born ) is an Indian American engineer, professor, and entrepreneur. He is the founder, chairman, and chief executive officer (CEO) of Bloom Energy. He was a professor of Aerospace and Mechanical Engineering as well as Director of the Space Technologies Laboratory (STL) at the University of Arizona. Sridhar is a member of the National Academy of Engineering.

Education 
Sridhar was awarded a bachelor's degree in mechanical engineering from the National Institute of Technology at Tiruchirappalli, Tamil Nadu, India in 1982. He moved to the United States and gained a M.S. in nuclear engineering and a PhD in mechanical engineering from University of Illinois at Urbana-Champaign in 1989.

Career 
Sridhar was the director of the Space Technologies Laboratory at the University of Arizona where he was also professor of Aerospace and Mechanical Engineering.

Oxygen production on Mars 
The Space Technologies Laboratory was asked by NASA to undertake research into how life could be made sustainable on Mars. The team built a device that could use solar power and water obtained from the planet to power a reactor cell that made oxygen to breathe and hydrogen to power vehicles.
Sridhar led a project that built a Mars oxygen production cell using a yttria-stabilized zirconia solid-electrolyte ionic conductor to electrolyse carbon dioxide into oxygen and carbon monoxide. The oxygen production unit was to fly as part of the MIP ("Mars ISPP Precursor") experiment package that was to be sent to Mars on the Mars Surveyor 2001 Lander mission. This would have been the first demonstration of in-situ resource utilization ("ISRU") for propellant production on another planet. However, the 2001 Surveyor Lander mission was cancelled after the failure of the Mars Polar Lander, which used an identical spacecraft.

Bloom Energy 
After NASA cancelled the Mars-2001 Surveyor Lander mission, Sridhar started working on reversing the process, using oxygen and hydrogen to create power.

In 2001, Sridhar was a co-founder of Ion America, later to become Bloom Energy, with a mission to "make clean, reliable energy affordable for everyone on earth". Sridhar became the chief executive officer. In 2002, the company moved to the NASA Ames Research Center in Silicon Valley.

On 24 February 2010, Bloom Energy launched a new energy-efficient and environmentally friendly fuel cell known as the Bloom Box. , natural gas and atmospheric oxygen are pumped through a stack of cells, producing electricity, but theoretically any other gaseous fuel could be used. The energy is clean and inexpensive, but development and production of this fuel cell required a large initial investment of $100 million. Sridhar was able to obtain funding for the project from investors such as Kleiner Perkins Caufield & Byers and New Enterprise Associates. Kleiner is represented on the Bloom Energy board of directors by John Doerr, an early investor in companies such as Amazon and Google as well.

Companies such as Adobe Systems, eBay, Google, FedEx, Wal-Mart and Yahoo have already leased larger-sized boxes.

References 

Indian emigrants to the United States
University of Arizona faculty
1960s births
National Institutes of Technology alumni
Living people
American people of Indian descent
American businesspeople
National Institute of Technology, Tiruchirappalli alumni
Grainger College of Engineering alumni
American people of Indian Tamil descent
21st-century American inventors